

560001–560100 

|-bgcolor=#f2f2f2
| colspan=4 align=center | 
|}

560101–560200 

|-bgcolor=#f2f2f2
| colspan=4 align=center | 
|}

560201–560300 

|-bgcolor=#f2f2f2
| colspan=4 align=center | 
|}

560301–560400 

|-id=354
| 560354 Chrisnolan ||  || Christopher Nolan is a British-American film director, producer, and screenwriter. || 
|}

560401–560500 

|-bgcolor=#f2f2f2
| colspan=4 align=center | 
|}

560501–560600 

|-bgcolor=#f2f2f2
| colspan=4 align=center | 
|}

560601–560700 

|-bgcolor=#f2f2f2
| colspan=4 align=center | 
|}

560701–560800 

|-bgcolor=#f2f2f2
| colspan=4 align=center | 
|}

560801–560900 

|-bgcolor=#f2f2f2
| colspan=4 align=center | 
|}

560901–561000 

|-bgcolor=#f2f2f2
| colspan=4 align=center | 
|}

References 

560001-561000